Pluma de Pato (Spanish for "Feather"'  "feather" and Andalusian Arabic: páṭṭ for "duck") is a village and rural municipality in Salta Province in northwestern Argentina.

References

Populated places in Salta Province